The 2019–20 season was Hellas Verona Football Club's 29th season in Serie A and their first back in the top-flight after being relegated to Serie B at the end of the 2017–18 Serie A season. The club finished 5th in the 2018–19 Serie B season and were promoted via winning the play-off.

Players

Squad information
Last updated on 8 February 2020
Appearances include league matches only

Transfers

In

Loans in

Out

Loans out

Pre-season and friendlies

Competitions

Serie A

League table

Results summary

Results by round

Matches

Coppa Italia

Statistics

Appearances and goals

|-
! colspan=14 style=background:#dcdcdc; text-align:center| Goalkeepers

|-
! colspan=14 style=background:#dcdcdc; text-align:center| Defenders

|-
! colspan=14 style=background:#dcdcdc; text-align:center| Midfielders

|-
! colspan=14 style=background:#dcdcdc; text-align:center| Forwards

|-
! colspan=14 style=background:#dcdcdc; text-align:center| Players transferred out during the season

Goalscorers

Last updated: 29 July 2020

Clean sheets

Last updated: 8 February 2020

Disciplinary record

Last updated: 8 February 2020

References

Hellas Verona F.C. seasons
Hellas Verona